Tarextumab (formerly OMP-59R5) is a fully human monoclonal antibody targeting the Notch 2/3 receptors. It is being tested as a possible treatment for cancer. In January 2015, the US FDA granted orphan drug designation to tarextumab for the treatment of pancreatic cancer and lung cancer. Two early stage clinical trials have reported encouraging results.

See also
 Notch signaling pathway, e.g. in embryo tissue development

References

Experimental cancer drugs
Monoclonal antibodies